The 1913 Chattanooga Moccasins football team represented the University of Chattanooga (now known as the University of Tennessee at Chattanooga) as an independent during the 1913 college football season. They finished their seven-game schedule with a record of 4–3.

Schedule

References

Chattanooga
Chattanooga Mocs football seasons
Chattanooga Moccasins football